"Dimming of the Day" is a song written by Richard Thompson and performed with his then-wife Linda Thompson on their 1975 album Pour Down Like Silver.

Covers (non-exhaustive list)

Dimming of the Day has been covered by:

 The Irish band the Corrs for their Irish-themed fifth studio album Home;
 Bonnie Raitt;
 Mary Black;
 Emmylou Harris;
 Alfie Boe from his album ’Trust’, featuring Shawn Colvin;
 The Blind Boys of Alabama;
 The Lasses;
 It was also featured, performed by Mary Elizabeth Mastrantonio, in John Sayles' 1999 film Limbo, being notable as marking an important story beat.
 Pink Floyd's David Gilmour in 2002 at his semi-acoustic shows in London's Royal Festival Hall; it was released on his David Gilmour in Concert DVD where he introduced the song as "this one's got nothing what-so-ever to do with me but I like it. It's by Richard Thompson and it's called Dimming of the Day."
The Dutch musician Gerard van Maasakkers recorded a version with a text in Brabantine, a Dutch dialect, As 't Dalijk Donker is (on his CD Zicht, 2006);
 Tom Jones performed the song in a concert broadcast by BBC4 and also on his 2012 album Spirit in the Room;
 Alison Krauss & Union Station on their album Paper Airplane;
 A new duet version is on the debut album of singer-actress Anastasia Barzee, and the album takes the name of this song.

See also
The Dawning of the Day

Richard Thompson (musician) songs
1975 songs
Songs written by Richard Thompson (musician)